"The Bubble Boy" is the 47th episode of the American sitcom Seinfeld. It is the seventh episode of the fourth season. In this episode, on the way to Susan's family cabin, the cast visits a youth who lives in quarantine due to an immune deficiency.

The episode was directed by Tom Cherones and written by Larry David and Larry Charles, airing on October 7, 1992.

Plot 
Jerry, George, Elaine, and George's girlfriend Susan plan to travel upstate to Susan's family's lakeside cabin. In the coffee shop, a man tells Jerry and Elaine about his son Donald, who lives in a plastic "bubble" which creates a germ-free sterile environment. Because Donald is a fan of Jerry's, the father petitions Jerry to visit Donald on the way to the cabin to cheer him up.

On the trip, exhilarated by the light traffic and the resulting chance to make excellent time, George drives at top speed, leaving Jerry and Elaine behind. As Jerry was relying on George to guide them, they quickly become lost. While waiting for Jerry to arrive, George and Susan play Trivial Pursuit with the "bubble boy." Irritated by Donald's taunting and condescension during the game, George disputes the answer to the question: "Who invaded Spain in the 8th century?" Donald correctly answers "the Moors," but due to a misprint, the question card says that the answer is "the Moops." George refuses to give Donald credit, and Donald begins strangling him. When Susan defends George, she accidentally punctures and depressurizes the bubble, causing Donald to collapse.

Jerry and Elaine exit the highway and go to a diner. A waitress there asks for an autographed picture of Jerry. Elaine pokes fun at what Jerry wrote, causing him to regret it, so he asks for it back. The waitress refuses, and it escalates to the point of the waitress attacking and strangling Jerry. Two men burst in and announce that Donald was attacked, and that his house is right down the street from the diner. Jerry and Elaine meet up with George and Susan at the house before being chased away by the residents of the town.

Jerry is dating Naomi, a restaurant waitress he met during a dinner with his parents and Uncle Leo. Having previously irked her after privately likening her laugh to that of “Elmer Fudd sitting on a juicer”, she calls out of the trip but quickly changes her mind. After his golf game is cancelled, Kramer and Naomi attempt to rendezvous with Jerry, Elaine, George, and Susan at Susan's family's cabin. Kramer carelessly leaves a lit cigar near some newspapers, which causes a fire that destroys the cabin. Jerry, Elaine, George, and Susan arrive shortly after the firefighters.

Production
The "Moops" misprint incident was based on a real-life incident that occurred to one of the Seinfeld writers while playing "Jeopardy! The Board Game" (9th Edition, 1972).

Eponymous computer virus

On November 10, 1999, a computer virus named "BubbleBoy" was discovered, apparently named after this episode. This was the first malware of its kind, having been able to activate itself (via an embedded Visual Basic script) upon the recipient opening the e-mail contents, as opposed to running an attachment. As such, in spite of not being dangerous, the virus changed the concept of antivirus technology.

References

External links 
 

Seinfeld (season 4) episodes
1992 American television episodes
Television episodes written by Larry David